Bolehall Swifts Football Club is a football club based in Bolehall, a suburb of Tamworth, Staffordshire, England.

History
The club was established in 1953. They joined the Tamworth & Trent Valley League, winning the League Shield and Agnes Durham Cup in their first season. The club later won the Coleshill Charity Cup in 1955–56 and the Fazeley Charity Cup in 1975–76.

After transferring to the Sutton District League, they moved on to the City & Suburban League, the Mercian League and then the Staffordshire County League (South). In 1980 the club moved up to Division Three of the Midland Combination. Division Three was renamed Division Two in 1983, and Bolehall were Division Two champions in 1984–85, also winning the Challenge Vase and the Fazeley Charity Cup. Following promotion to Division One, they finished fifth in Division One the following season and were promoted to the Premier Division.

In 1994 Bolehall were founder members of the Midland Alliance. However, after finishing second-from-bottom of the league in its inaugural season, they finished last in 1995–96 and were relegated back to the Premier Division of the Midland Combination. The club remained in the Premier Division until 2014, winning the Challenge Cup in 1997–98, the Walsall Senior Cup in 2001–02 and the Birmingham Midweek Floodlit Cup in 2013–14. In 2014 the Midland Combination and Midland Alliance merged to form the Midland League, with Bolehall placed in Division One. The club won the Fazeley Charity Cup again in 2014–15.

Ground

The club initially played behind the Jolly Sailor pub near the Castle Grounds in Tamworth, using an old double decker bus as changing rooms. They later moved to Morrows' Field, located to the rear of the Gate Inn in Amington, before purchasing some allotments on Rene Road from a local farmer in 1959 for £350.

The new Rene Road ground was opened in August 1961 with a friendly against Tamworth WMC. A 150-seat stand known as the "Welcome to Bolehall Swifts Stand" was built behind one goal, with the standing only "Founded 1953 Stand" on one side of the pitch.

Management and coaching staff

Boardroom

Current staff

Managerial history

Honours
Midland Combination
Division Two champions 1984–85
Challenge Cup winners 1997–98
Challenge Vase winners 1984–85
Tamworth & Trent Valley League
League Shield winners 1953–54
Agnes Durham Cup winners 1953–54
Walsall Senior Cup
Winners 2001–02
Coleshill Charity Cup
Winners 1955–56
Fazeley Charity Cup
Winners 1975–76, 1984–85, 2014–15
Birmingham Midweek Floodlit Cup
Winners 2013–14

Records
Best FA Cup performance: First qualifying round, 1994–95, 1995–96
Best FA Vase performance: Third round, 2013–14, 2014–15

See also
Bolehall Swifts F.C. players
Bolehall Swifts F.C. managers

References

External links
Official website

 
Football clubs in England
Football clubs in Staffordshire
Association football clubs established in 1953
1953 establishments in England
Sport in Tamworth, Staffordshire
Staffordshire County League (South)
Midland Football Combination
Midland Football Alliance
Midland Football League